De vetula ("On the Old Woman") is a long 13th-century elegiac comedy written in Latin. It is pseudepigraphically signed "Ovidius", and in its time was attributed to the classical Latin poet Ovid. It consists of three books of hexameters, and was quoted by Roger Bacon. In its slight plot, the aging Ovid is duped by a go-between, and renounces love affairs. Its interest to modern readers lies in the discursive padding of the story.

Attribution

Its actual author, "Pseudo-Ovidius" to scholars, has been thought to be Richard de Fournival, but this is not universally accepted. The attribution to Ovid was reinforced by an implausible claim that the poem had been found in his tomb. The poem presents him as a Christian convert. The authorship of Ovid was questioned by the fifteenth-century humanist Angelo Decembrio; in fact Petrarch had already denied that Ovid could be the poet.

There was a translation or paraphrase of the 1370s into French as La vieille ("The Old Woman") by Jean Le Fèvre. This was followed by a Catalan prose translation Ovidi enamorat by Bernat Metge in the 1380s.

The work was first printed around 1475.

Non-poetic content

It existed in numerous manuscripts, and is of independent interest because of its references to astronomy and gambling. The numerical game Rithmomachia is praised in it, and an ancestor of backgammon is mentioned. Another pastime given extended treatment is fishing.

At least in some manuscripts, the account of a dice game was accompanied by an enumeration of the combinations of three conventional cubic dice, and an explanation of the connection between the number of combinations and the expected frequency of a given total.

Influence

Roger Bacon took from Book III of De vetula a link between Aristotle and astronomy. He also was influenced by work of the astronomer Abu Ma'shar al-Balkhi as represented in the poem. Another who cited it out of scientific interest was Thomas Bradwardine.

Richard de Bury cites it in his Philobiblon, and Juan Ruiz drew on it for his Libro de buen amor.

References
Paul Klopsch (1967), Pseudo-Ovidius De vetula. Untersuchungen und Text
Dorothy M. Robathan (1968), The Pseudo-Ovidian De Vetula: Text, Introduction, and Notes
D. R. Bellhouse (2000), "De Vetula: a medieval manuscript containing probability calculations", International Statistical Review 68: 123 – 136.
Ralph Hexter, Laura Pfuntner, and Justin Haynes (2020), "On the Old Woman," in Appendix Ovidiana: Latin Poems Ascribed to Ovid in the Middle Ages, Dumbarton Oaks Medieval Library 62, pp. 134–297 (text and English translation)

Notes

Poems
History of mathematics
Cultural depictions of Ovid